Living on Video (also known as Message on the Radio) is the first studio album by the Canadian synth-pop group Trans-X. Recorded and released in 1983 by Mantra Records, Message on the Radio was a seven-track album. Produced by Daniel Bernier, the record featured all instruments played by Pascal Languirand with Anne Brosseau on supporting vocals. The album was reissued in 1993 and contains a total of 14 tracks.

Track listing

1993 CD reissue

Personnel

Musicians
Pascal Languirand - lead vocals, performer
Pierre Lacoste - percussion ("Living on Video", "Message on the Radio")
Pierre Lacoste - drums ("Josee")
Guy Abrassart - guitar ("Message on the Radio", "Josee")
Steve Wyatt - synthesizer ("Digital World")
René Grignon - synthesizer ("Eyes of desire")
Laurie Ann Gill - female voice

Additional personnel
Daniel Bernier - producer
Carmine Nicodemo, Dominique Nicodemo - executive producer
Pierre Bernard - synthesizer programming
Claude Allard - mixing, engineer
Gaetan Desbiens - recorded by
Christian Traut - artwork by
Anne Brosseau, Chiffon, Ian Lebofsky, Linda Benoy, Liz Tansey - additional personnel
Carole Arsenaul - hair
Lisa Fizzano - makeup
Daniel Poulin - photography

Instruments: Roland Jupiter 4 and 6, CSQ 600 and TR-808, Korg Vocoder and Polysix, Oberheim OB8, Oberheim DMX and Oberheim DSX, Elka Synthex, electric guitar, Simmons and Mattel drums.

References

External links
Music video for "Message on The Radio"
Music video for "Living on Video"

1983 debut albums
Trans-X albums